Claude Domeizel (born 16 May 1940) is a French politician and a former member of the Senate of France. He represented the Alpes de Haute-Provence department as a member of the Socialist Party.

References
Page on the Senate website

1940 births
Living people
French Senators of the Fifth Republic
Socialist Party (France) politicians
Senators of Alpes-de-Haute-Provence
Place of birth missing (living people)